The Heroica Escuela Naval Militar is the officer training academy of the Mexican Navy.

It began operations on 1 June 1897 with a group of cadets from the Mexican Army's Colegio Militar who had expressed an interest in training as naval officers. It was originally located on the premises of the military garrison in Veracruz. Its original staff comprised one commandant (Captain Juan Antonio Bernal of the Navy), two officers and six teachers, with 26 cadets.

It was given the appellation Heroica ("Heroic") for its efforts in defending the port during the 1914 United States occupation of Veracruz.

On 11 November 1952, the Academy moved to new premises in Antón Lizardo, Veracruz

Before graduating, final year cadets take an instructional journey on the ARM Cuauhtémoc. Since 2008, the school has accepted female cadets of the service branches.

Currently, all graduates earn a Bachelor of Science degree with a major in engineering. There are six available concentrations: naval systems (general corps), Hydraulic engineering (marine infantry), naval mechanical engineering, engineering in electronics and naval communications, aeronaval engineering and logistics engineering.

References

External links
Escuela Naval Militar (Secretariat of the Navy)

Mexican Navy
Military academies of Mexico
Naval academies
Educational institutions established in 1897
1897 establishments in Mexico